Pierre Lasbordes (born May 13, 1946 in Meaux) was a member of the National Assembly of France.  He represented Essonne's 5th constituency  from 1997 to 2012, and was a member of the Union for a Popular Movement.

References

1946 births
Living people
People from Meaux
Politicians from Île-de-France
Rally for the Republic politicians
Union for a Popular Movement politicians
Deputies of the 11th National Assembly of the French Fifth Republic
Deputies of the 12th National Assembly of the French Fifth Republic
Deputies of the 13th National Assembly of the French Fifth Republic